Victoria Maria DeFrancesco Soto is an American political scientist and academic administrator. She is dean of the Clinton School of Public Service at the University of Arkansas. She was previously the assistant dean for civic engagement and a senior lecturer at the Lyndon B. Johnson School of Public Affairs.

She researches immigration, women and politics, political psychology, and campaigns and elections.

DeFrancesco Soto was born to Victoria and Joseph DeFrancesco in Southern Arizona. Her mother is from Sonora. She is of Italian, Jewish, and Mexican descent. She completed a bachelor's degree in political science and Latin American studies at the University of Arizona. She earned a master's and Ph.D. from the Graduate School of Duke University. Her 2007 dissertation was titled, Do Latinos Party All the Time? The Role of Shared Ethnic Group Identity on Political. John Aldrich was her doctoral advisor.

DeFrancesco Soto is the first Latina dean of the Clinton School of Public Service.

References

External links

Living people
Year of birth missing (living people)
American women academics
American women political scientists
American university and college faculty deans
University of Arkansas faculty
University of Texas at Austin faculty
University of Arizona alumni
American people of Italian descent
American people of Jewish descent
American academics of Mexican descent
Women deans (academic)
Duke University alumni
21st-century American women scientists
Hispanic and Latino American social scientists
21st-century political scientists